The AGM-181 Long Range Stand Off Weapon (LRSO) is a nuclear-armed air-launched cruise missile under development by Raytheon Technologies that will replace the AGM-86 ALCM.

Development
As of August 24, 2017, Raytheon and Lockheed Martin received separate $900 million contracts from the Department of Defense and US Air Force and are developing their own versions. Contracts were intended to end in 2022, when the Department of Defense will select one design to continue further developments.

To replace the ALCM, the USAF planned to award a contract for the development of the new Long-Range Stand-Off weapon in 2015. Unlike the AGM-86, the LRSO will be carried on multiple aircraft. The LRSO program is to develop a weapon that can penetrate and survive integrated air defense systems and prosecute strategic targets.  The weapons are required to reach initial operational capability (IOC) before the retirement of their respective ALCM versions, around 2030.

The technology development contracts were to be submitted before the end of 2012. In March 2014 a further three-year delay in the project was announced by the Department of Defense, delaying a contract award until fiscal year 2018. The House Armed Services Committee moved to reject this delay. The delay was caused by financial pressures and an uncertain acquisition plan, and allowed by the long remaining service life left for the AGM-86 and lack of urgent necessity compared to other defense needs. The designations YAGM-180A and YAGM-181A have been allocated to the LRSO prototypes from Lockheed Martin and Raytheon Technologies respectively. The FY2020 defense authorization bill passed by Congress repealed the requirement for a conventional warhead version of the LRSO, leaving only the nuclear armed variant. The Air Force will use the JASSM-ER and the longer-ranged JASSM-XR to fulfill the conventional standoff missile role.

In April 2020, the Air Force announced plans to continue the Long-Range Standoff Weapon’s development with Raytheon Company as a sole-source contractor.

On 1 July 2021, the USAF awarded Raytheon a cost-plus-fixed-fee contract for the engineering and manufacturing development stage of the LRSO program, with options that could take the contract to about US$2 billion.

Design
The AGM-181 will be integrated with the B-52H and B-21 bomber. The missile's nuclear warhead will be the W80 mod 4 warhead.

Users
  (planned)

See also
 AGM-158 JASSM

References

 
Air-to-surface missiles of the United States
Nuclear cruise missiles of the United States